Bojanić is a South-Slavic patronymic surname, derived from the given name Bojan. It may refer to:
 
Darijan Bojanić (born 1994), Swedish footballer
Dragomir Bojanić (1933–1993), Serbian actor
Ines Bojanić, Croatian actress
Milenko Bojanić (1924-1987), Yugoslav politician and university professor
Miloš Bojanić (born 1950), Bosnian turbo folk singer
Bane Bojanić, Bosnian singer and son of Miloš
Mikica Bojanić, Bosnian singer and son of Miloš
Mladen Bojanić (born 1962), Montenegrin economist and politician
Zoran Bojanić (born 1959), Serbian politician

Serbian surnames
Montenegrin surnames
Croatian surnames